The Dorian invasion is a concept devised by historians of Ancient Greece to explain the replacement of pre-classical dialects and traditions in southern Greece by the ones that prevailed in Classical Greece. The latter were named "Dorian" by the ancient Greek writers, after the Dorians, the historical population that spoke them.

Greek legend asserts that the Dorians took possession of the Peloponnesus in an event called the Return of the Heracleidae . Nineteenth-century Classical scholars saw in the legend a possibly real event they termed the Dorian invasion. The meaning of the concept has changed several times, as historians, philologists and archaeologists used it in attempts to explain the cultural discontinuities expressed in the data of their fields. The pattern of arrival of Dorian culture on certain islands in the Mediterranean, such as Crete, is also not well understood. The Dorians colonised a number of sites on Crete such as Lato.

Despite nearly 200 years of investigation, the historicity of a mass migration of Dorians into Greece has never been established, and the origin of the Dorians remains unknown. Firm archeological evidence of such an invasion has not been established. Nonetheless, the pervasiveness of the Dorians in literature means that most historians do not reject the theory. Some have linked them or their victims with the emergence of the equally mysterious Sea Peoples during the Late Bronze Age collapse.  The meaning of the phrase "Dorian invasion" as an explanation for the cultural and economic breakdown after the Mycenaean period and into the Greek Dark Ages has become to some degree amorphous.

Return of the Heracleidae

Classical tradition, as recorded for example in Herodotus, describes the "Return of the Heracleidae" (Ἐπιστροφὴ τῶν Ἡρακλειδῶν), the descendants of Heracles, who were exiled at his death and returned in later generations to reclaim the dominion that Heracles had held in the Peloponnesus. The Heraclid leaders were the brothers Kresphontes and Temenos, as well as the twins Eurysthenes and Prokles, all descendants of Heracles. They divided most of the Peloponnese into three parts: Kresphontes took Messenia, Temenos the north-east, and the twins Laconia, thus becoming the first dual kings of Sparta.

The Greece to which the tradition refers is the mythic one, now considered to be Mycenaean Greece. The details differ from one ancient author to another, the commonality being that a traditional ruling clan traced its legitimacy to Heracles.

The Greek words referring to the influx of the Dorians are katienai and katerchesthai, literally "to descend",  "come down" or "go down" or, less commonly, "be brought down." It means a descent from uplands to lowlands, or from earth to grave, or rushing down as a flood, or sweeping down as a wind, or those who have returned from exile by ship.  This sweeping down upon the Peloponnesus invited the English translation "invasion".

There is, however, a distinction between Heracleidae and Dorians. George Grote summarizes the relationship as follows:Herakles himself had rendered inestimable aid to the Dorian king Aegimius, when the latter was hard pressed in a contest with the Lapithae .... Herakles defeated the Lapithae and slew their king Koronus; in return for which Aegimius assigned to his deliverers one third part of his whole territory and adopted Hyllus as his son.
After the death of Heracles, Hyllus (a Perseid) was driven from the state of Mycenae into exile by a dynastic rival, Eurystheus (another Perseid):
After the death ... of Herakles, his son Hyllos and his other children were expelled and persecuted by Eurystheus ... Eurystheus invaded Attica, but perished in the attempt .... All the sons of Eurystheus lost their lives ... with him, so that the Perseid family was now represented only by the Herakleids ....The Pelopid family now assumed power. The Heraclids "endeavored to recover the possessions from which they had been expelled" but were defeated by the Ionians at the Isthmus of Corinth. Hyllus staked peace for three generations against immediate reoccupation on a single combat and was killed by Echemus of Arcadia.

The Heracleidae now found it prudent to claim the Dorian land granted to Heracles: "and from this moment the Herakleids and Dorians became intimately united together into one social communion." Three generations later the Heracleidae with Dorian collusion occupied the Peloponnesus, an event Grote terms a "victorious invasion."

The term "invasion"

The first widespread use of the term "Dorian invasion" appears to date to the 1830s. A popular alternative was "Dorian migration". For example, in 1831 Thomas Keightly was using "Dorian migration" in Outline of History; by 1838 in The Mythology of Ancient Greece and Italy he was using "Dorian invasion".

Neither of those two words exactly fits the events, as they imply an incursion from outside a society to within; but the Dorians were not outside of either Greece or Greek society. William Mitford's History of Greece (1784–1810) described a "Dorian conquest" followed by "a revolution in Peloponnesus so complete that, except in the rugged province of Arcadia, nothing remained unaltered."

In 1824 Karl Otfried Müller's Die Dorier was published in German and was translated into English by Tufnel and Lewis for publication in 1830. They use such terms as "the Doric invasion" and "the invasion of the Dorians" to translate Müller's "Die Einwanderung von den Doriern" (literally: "the migration of the Dorians"), which was quite a different concept.

On one level the Einwanderung meant no more than the Heraklidenzug, the return of the Heracleidae. However, Müller was also applying the sense of Völkerwanderung to it, which was being used of the Germanic migrations. Müller's approach was philological. In trying to explain the distribution of tribes and dialects he hypothesized that the aboriginal or Pelasgian population was Hellenic. His first paragraph of the Introduction asserts:

Müller goes on to propose that the original Pelasgian language was the common ancestor of Greek and Latin, that it evolved into Proto-Greek and was corrupted in Macedon and Thessaly by invasions of Illyrians. This same pressure of Illyrians drove forth Greeks speaking Achaean (including Aeolian), Ionian, and finally Dorian in three diachronic waves, explaining the dialect distribution of Greek in classical times.

Following this traditional view, the linguist Albert Thumb noticed that in the Peloponnesus and in the islands, where the Dorians established themselves, their dialect showed elements  of the Arcadian dialect. This can be explained if the Dorians conquered a Pre-Doric population, which was pushed into the Arcadian mountains. Where the Dorians were a minority, there is a mixed dialect, as in Boeotia, or the Dorians adopted the existing dialect, as in Thessaly. To the Achaeans described by Homer belongs the Aeolic-Arcadian dialect in the whole of eastern Greece, with the exception of Attica, where the Ionians were confined. The Ionians must be considered the oldest first wave of the Greek migration.

In 1902, K. Paparigopoulos, calling the event the "Descent of the Heraclidae", stated that the Heraclidae came from Thessaly after being expelled by the Thessalians living in Epirus.

Kretschmer's external Greeks
Toward the end of the 19th century the philologist Paul Kretschmer made a strong case that Pelasgian was a pre-Greek substrate, perhaps Anatolian, taking up a classical theme of remnant populations existing in pockets among the Greek speakers, in mountainous and rural Arcadia and in inaccessible coasts of the far south. This view left Müller's proto-Greeks without a homeland, but Kretschmer did not substitute the Heracleidae or their Dorian allies from Macedon and Thessaly. Instead he removed the earliest Greeks to the trail leading from the plains of Asia, where he viewed the Proto-Indo-European language as having broken up about 2500 BC. Kretschmer suggested that somewhere between that Asian homeland and Greece a new cradle of the Greek tribes developed, from which Proto-Ionians at about 2000 BC, Proto-Achaeans at about 1600 BC and Dorians at about 1200 BC came to swoop down on an increasingly less aboriginal Greece as three waves of external Greeks.

Kretschmer was confident that if the unknown homeland of the Greeks was not then known, archaeology would find it. The handbooks of Greek history from then on spoke of Greeks entering Greece. As late as 1956 J.B. Bury's History of Greece (3rd edition) wrote of an "invasion which brought the Greek language into Greece". Over that half-century Greek and Balkan archaeology united in an effort to locate the Dorians further north than Greece. The idea was combined with a view that the Sea Peoples were part of the same north-south migration about 1200 BC.

The weakness in this theory is that it requires both an invaded Greece and an external area where Greek evolved and continued to evolve into dialects contemporaneously with the invaded Greece. However, although the invaded Greece was amply represented by evidence of all sorts, there was no evidence at all of the external homeland. Similarly, a clear Greek homeland for the Sea Peoples failed to materialize. Retaining Müller's three waves and Kretschmer's Pelasgian pockets the scholars continued to search for the Dorians in other quarters. Müller's common ancestor of Greek and Latin had vanished by 1950; and by 1960, although still given lip service, the concept of Greek developing outside of Greece was in decline.

Greek origin in Greece

Additional progress in the search for the Dorian invasion resulted from the decipherment of Linear B inscriptions. The language of the Linear B texts is an early form of Greek now known as Mycenaean Greek. Comparing it with the later Greek dialects scholars could trace the development of the dialects from the earlier Mycenaean. For example, classical Greek anak-s, "king", was postulated to be derived from a reconstructed form *wanak-.

Ernst Risch lost no time in proposing that there was never more than one migration, which brought Proto-Greek into Greece. Proto-Greek is the assumed last common ancestor of all known varieties of Greek and then dissimilated into dialects within Greece.  Meanwhile, the linguists closest to the decipherment were having doubts about the classification of Proto-Greek. John Chadwick summarizing in 1976 wrote:Let us therefore explore the alternative view. This hypothesis is that the Greek language did not exist before the twentieth century B.C., but was formed in Greece by the mixture of an indigenous population with invaders who spoke another language .... What this language was is a difficult question ... the exact stage reached in development at the time of the arrival is difficult to predict.
Georgiev suggested that:
The Proto-Greek region included Epirus, approximately up to Αυλών in the north including Paravaia, Tymphaia, Athamania, Dolopia, Amphilochia, and Acarnania, west and north Thessaly (Hestiaiotis, Perrhaibia, Tripolis, and Pieria), i.e. more or less the territory of contemporary northwestern Greece

In another ten years the "alternative view" was becoming the standard one. JP Mallory wrote in 1989 concerning the various hypotheses of Proto-Greek that had been put forward since the decipherment:Reconciliation of all these different theories seems out of the question ... the current state of our knowledge of the Greek dialects can accommodate Indo-Europeans entering Greece at any time between 2200 and 1600 BC to emerge later as Greek speakers.

By the end of the 20th century the concept of an invasion by external Greek speakers had ceased to be the mainstream view (although still asserted by a minority); thus Geoffrey Horrocks writes:Greek is now widely believed to be the product of contact between Indo-European immigrants and the speakers of the indigenous languages of the Balkan peninsula beginning c. 2,000 B.C.

If the different dialects had developed within Greece no subsequent invasions were required to explain their presence.

Destruction at the end of Mycenaean IIIB

Meanwhile, the archaeologists were encountering what appeared to be a wave of destruction of Mycenaean palaces. Indeed, the Pylos tablets recorded the dispatch of "coast-watchers", to be followed not long after by the burning of the palace, presumably by invaders from the sea. Carl Blegen wrote:The telltale track of the Dorians must be recognized in the fire-scarred ruins of all the great palaces and the more important towns which ... were blotted out at the end of Mycenaean IIIB.
Blegen follows Furumark in dating Mycenaean IIIB to 1300–1230 BC. Blegen himself dated the Dorian invasion to 1200 BC.

A destruction by Dorians has its own problems (as discussed in the next section) and is not the only possible explanation. At approximately this time Hittite power in Anatolia collapsed with the destruction of their capital Hattusa, and the late 19th and the 20th dynasties of Egypt suffered invasions of the Sea Peoples. A theory, reported for instance by Thomas and Conant, attributes the ruin of the Peloponnesus to the Sea Peoples:Evidence on the Linear B tablets from the Mycenaean kingdom of Pylos describing the dispatch of rowers and watchers to the coast, for instance, may well date to the time that the Egyptian pharaoh was expecting the arrival of foes.

The identity of the foes remained a question. The evidence suggests that some of the Sea Peoples may have been Greek. However, most of the destroyed Mycenaean sites are far from the sea, and the expedition against Troy at the end of this period shows that the sea was safe. Desborough believes that the sea was safe in central and south Aegean in this period.

Michael Wood suggests relying on tradition, especially that of Thucydides:[L]et us not forget the legends, at least as models for what might have happened. They tell us of constant rivalries with the royal clans of the Heroic Age – Atreus and Thyestes, Agamemnon and Aigisthes, and so on ....
In summary, it is possible that the Mycenaean world disintegrated through "feuding clans of the great royal families". The possibility of some sort of internal struggle had long been under consideration. Chadwick, after following and critiquing the development of different views, in 1976 settled on a theory of his own: There was no Dorian invasion. The palaces were destroyed by Dorians who had been in the Peloponnesus all along as a subservient lower class (Linear B: , do-e-ro, "male slave";),  and now were staging a revolution. Chadwick espoused the view that northern Greek was the more conservative language, and proposed that southern Greek had developed under Minoan influence as a palace language.

Mylonas joins two of the previous possibilities. He believes that some developments in Argolis and attempts for recovery after 1200 BC,  can be explained by an internal fighting, and by an enemy pressure, by the Dorians. Even if the Dorians were one of the causes of the Bronze age collapse, there is evidence that they brought with them  some new elements of culture. It seems that the Doric clans moved southward gradually over a number of years, and they devastated the territory, until they managed to establish themselves in the Mycenaean centres.

Invasion or migration

After the Greek Dark Ages, much of the population of the Peloponnesus spoke Dorian, while the evidence of Linear B and literary traditions, such as the works of Homer, suggests that the population had spoken Achaean – Mycenaean Greek – before. In addition, society in the Peloponnesus had undergone a total change from states ruled by kings presiding over a Palace economy to a caste system ruled by a Dorian master ethnos at Sparta.

According to the scholar H. Michell: "If we assume that the Dorian invasion took place some time in the twelfth century, we certainly know nothing of them for the next hundred years." Blegen admitted that in the sub-Mycenaean period following 1200, "the whole area seems to have been sparsely populated or almost deserted."

The problem is that there are no traces of any Dorians anywhere until the start of the Geometric period about 950 BC. This simple pottery decoration appears to be correlated with other changes in material culture, such as the introduction of iron weapons and alterations in burial practices, from Mycenaean group burials in tholos tombs to individual burials and cremation. These can certainly be associated with the historical Dorian settlers, such as those of Sparta in the 10th century BC. However, they appear to have been general over all of Greece; moreover, the new weapons would not have been used in 1200.

The scholars were now faced with the conundrum of an invasion at 1200 but a resettlement at 950. One explanation is that the destruction of 1200 was not caused by them, and that the quasi-mythical return of the Heracleidae is to be associated with settlement at Sparta c. 950. On the one hand, it is possible that the destruction of the Mycenaean centres was caused by the wandering of northern people (Dorian migration): destroying the palace of Iolcos (LH III C-1), the palace of Thebes ( late LH III B), then crossing Isthmus of Corinth (end of LH III B) and destroying Mycenae, Tiryns and Pylos, and finally returning northward. However, Pylos was destroyed by a sea-attack, the invaders didn't leave behind traces of weapons or graves, and it cannot be proved that all the sites were destroyed about the same time. It is also possible that the Doric clans moved southward gradually over a number of years, devastating the territory, until they managed to establish themselves in the Mycenaean centres.

Closing the gap

The quest for the Dorian invasion had begun as an attempt to explain the differences between Peloponnesian society depicted by Homer and the historical Dorians of classical Greece. The first scholars to work on the problem were historians researching the only resources available to them: the Greek legends. The philologists (later linguists) subsequently took up the challenge but in the end only brought the problem into sharper definition. Finally the archaeologists have inherited the issue. Perhaps some distinctively Dorian archaeological evidence will turn up or has turned up giving precise insight as to how and when Peloponnesian society changed so radically.

The historians had defined the Greek Dark Ages, a period of general decline, in this case the disappearance of the palace economy and with it law and order, loss of writing, diminishment of trade, decrease in population and abandonment of settlements (destroyed or undestroyed), metals starvation and loss of the fine arts or at least the diminution of their quality, evidenced especially in pottery. By its broadest definition the dark age lasted between 1200 and 750, the start of the archaic or orientalizing period, when influence from the Middle East via the overseas colonies stimulated a recovery.

A dark age of poverty, low population and metals starvation is not compatible with the idea of great population movements of successful warriors wielding the latest military equipment sweeping into the Peloponnesus and taking it over to rebuild civilization their way. This dark age consists of three periods of art and archaeology: sub-Mycenaean, Proto-geometric and Geometric. The most successful, the Geometric, seems to fit the Dorians better, but there is a gap, and this period is not localized to and did not begin in Dorian territory. It is more to be associated with Athens, an Ionian state.

Still, the Dorians did share in the Geometric period and therefore to find its origin might be perhaps to find the origin of the Dorians. The Geometric originated by clear transition from the Proto-geometric. The logical break in material culture is the start of the Proto-geometric at about 1050 BC, which leaves a gap of 150 years. The year 1050 offers nothing distinctively Dorian either, but if the Dorians were present in the Geometric, and they were not always in place as an unrecorded lower class, 1050 is most likely time of entry. Cartledge says humorously:It has of late become an acknowledged scandal that the Dorians, archaeologically speaking, do not exist. That is, there is no cultural trait surviving in the material record for the two centuries or so after 1200 which can be regarded as a peculiarly Dorian hallmark. Robbed of their patents for Geometric pottery, cremation burial, iron-working and, the unkindest prick of all, the humble straight pin, the hapless Dorians stand naked before their creator – or, some would say, inventor.

The question remains open to further investigation.

See also

Ancient Greek dialects
Comparative method
Doric Greek
Doris
Dorus, the eponymous founder
Greek Dark Ages
Historical linguistics
Vedic Period
Pre-modern human migration
Indo-European migrations

Notes

Bibliography

External links
 
W. G. Forrest, History of Sparta, 950–192 B.C., New York/London, 1968.
 .
 

Dorians
Mycenaean Greece
Iron Age Greece
Invasions of Greece
Late Bronze Age collapse
Greek Dark Ages